Nils Blommér, born Nils Johan Olsson (12 June 1816 – 1 February 1853) was a Swedish painter. His middle name is sometimes given as Jakob.

Biography 
He was born to the schoolteacher, Anders Olsson, and his wife, Elsa née Jakobsdotter, in Blommeröd, a village in the Diocese of Lund.

In 1847, he received a generous scholarship that enabled him to go to Paris, where he studied with Léon Cogniet. It was there he adopted the name "Blommér", after his birthplace. Later, he came under the influence of the Neo-Romantics, such as Erik Gustaf Geijer, Per Daniel Amadeus Atterbom and Erik Johan Stagnelius. He also drew inspiration from Swedish folk songs and the folklore motifs of the Austrian painter, Moritz von Schwind. He firmly believed that nature had an inherent soul; symbolized by folk characters.

Around 1850, he moved to Italy where, in November 1852, he married , also a painter. A few weeks later, he caught pneumonia and died in Rome, from related complications, early the following year.

Blommér's best known works are based on Norse mythology and folklore. They include Älfdrömmen, Sommarnattsdrömmen, Näcken och Ägirs döttrar, Brage och Iduna, Freja, Loke och Sigyn and Älfvor. They may be seen at the Göteborgs konstmuseum, Livrustkammaren and the Nationalmuseum.

Gallery

Sources

This article is based on the public domain Svenskt biografiskt handlexikon
 Gunnar Olof Hyltén-Cavallius, Historie-målaren Nils Johan Olsson Blommér, 1854 
 Annika Nordin, "På spaning efter Näcken eller en spelmans jordefärd", In: Paletten, Vol.4, 1990 pp. 15–19 
 Patrik Reuterswärd, "Två fullödiga verk av Nils Jakob Blommér: "Ängsälvor" och ett makalöst porträtt", In: Konsthistorisk tidskrift, 1996, Scandinavian University Press 
 August Sohlman, "N. J. O. Blommér", In: Svea folkkalender, 1854 (Online)
 Gustave Thomæus, Nils Jakob Blommér, Skånska Central, 1922 (WorldCat)

1816 births
1853 deaths
19th-century Swedish painters
Mythological painters
Swedish male painters
Deaths from pneumonia in Lazio
19th-century Swedish male artists